Broadholme Priory was a convent of canonesses of the Premonstratensian Order located near to the village of Broadholme. Historically in Nottinghamshire, since boundary changes in 1989, the priory and village has been in Lincolnshire.

History
The priory was founded before 1154. It was home to Premonstratensian canonesses and was one of only two female priories of that order in England (the other being Orford Priory). When it was founded, however, it was initially home to both canons and canonesses. The priory was dedicated to God and St Mary, and its mother-house was Newsham Abbey in Lincolnshire.

Pope Nicholas IV's taxation roll records the priory as having an income of £4 13s. The priory was also in control of the church at Thorney, Nottinghamshire, which provided an extra £8 annual income.

The priory was given a charter of confirmation by King Edward II in 1318. The charter reveals several of the priory's benefactors, including donations by: 
Ralph D'Aubeney – an orchard adjacent to the cemetery of St Botolph's church, Saxilby
Hugh de Basset – "rents" in Newark, Nottinghamshire and two quarters of corn
Peter de Campania – land at Stow, Lincolnshire
Richard de Claypole – land in North Collingham
Walter and Agnes de Clifford – Thorney church, land and a mill;
Geoffrey de Crosby – land in Ingleby
Walter Faber – land at Torksey
Peter and Agnes Goushill (and their children)– large amounts of land and several tenements in Saxilby
Simon de Hale – land at Little Hale
Ralph de Muscamp and Isabel (daughter of  de Collingham) – "rents" in Collingham
William Newbrid – "rents" in Broadholme
Baldwin Wake – "rents" in Skellingthorpe
William Wynok – a "toft" in Fillingham
Aubrea and Ivo ("children of Ralph, son of Lambert") – "lands and rents in the parish of Sir Edward Wigford" (Lincoln)

Queen Isabel (consort of King Edward II) was a patroness of the canonesses and is known "for the special affection which she bore to them". In 1327 she donated the annual sum of 8 marks to the priory from her lands at Great Massingham in Norfolk. In 1329 the Sheriff of Norfolk was given responsibility for ensuring the canonesses received their payment. In October 1327 Isabel arranged the transfer of the mortmain of certain lands to the priory, valued as worth £10 per year.

In 1478 the priory was visited, and it was recorded that all of the canonesses could read and sing.

In 1494 the priory was recorded as home to the prioress and eight canonesses: 
Dame Elizabeth Brerworth (priorissa)
Johanna Stertone (suppriorissa)
Dame Elizabeth Formane
Agnes Aschby
Johanna Newsome
Margery Robynsone
Johanna Roos
Johanna Steyntone
Johanna Uptone

The Valor Ecclesiasticus of 1534 records the gross annual value of this small priory as £18 11s. 10d.

The priory was dissolved in 1536. On 12 December 1536 the last prioress, Joan Aungewen (or Angevin), was assigned a pension of 7 marks.

The site was granted by the Crown to Ralph Jackson in 1537.

Remains
The remains of the monastic buildings are thought to have been incorporated into Manor Farm, which was built on the site; there are, however, no visible architectural remains. The priory chapel was located at the back of the current house and the cemetery was to the east in an area occupied by an orchard. The priory's former fishponds were filled in during the 1960s.

Prioresses of Broadholme
 Matilda, occurs 1326
 Joan de Rield, occurs 1354
 Agnes de Belyngham, occurs in 1418 
 Elizabeth de Brerworth, occurs 1496
 Joan Aungewen, occurs 1534 and 1536

References

1536 disestablishments in England
Monasteries in Nottinghamshire
Monasteries in Lincolnshire
Premonstratensian nunneries
Nunneries in England
Premonstratensian monasteries in England